Helvibotys is a genus of moths of the family Crambidae.

Species
Helvibotys freemani 
Helvibotys helvialis (Walker, 1859)
Helvibotys pseudohelvialis 
Helvibotys pucilla 
Helvibotys sinaloensis

References

Pyraustinae
Crambidae genera
Taxa named by Eugene G. Munroe